The Shuttered Room and Other Pieces is an anthology of fantasy and horror short stories, essays and memoirs by American author H. P. Lovecraft and others. It was released in 1959 by Arkham House in an edition of 2,527 copies and was the fifth collection of Lovecraft's work to be released by Arkham House. August Derleth, the owner of Arkham House, and an admirer and literary executor to Lovecraft, edited the collection and wrote the title story, "The Shuttered Room", as well as another story, "The Fisherman of Falcon Point" from lines of story ideas left by Lovecraft after his death. Derleth billed himself as a "posthumous collaborator".

Although most copies of this volume have the usual Holliston Black Novilex binding used by Arkham House at this period, there are reportedly some copies (possibly a few dozen) with less sturdy "board" covers made of a softer material and without the dustjacket. These may constitute a variant state of the volume.

Film
A British film titled The Shuttered Room based on the eponymous short story was released in 1967.

Contents

The Shuttered Room and Other Pieces contains the following pieces:

 "Foreword", by August Derleth
 "The Shuttered Room" by August Derleth (inspired by notes by H.P. Lovecraft)
 "The Fisherman of Falcon Point" by August Derleth (inspired by notes by H.P. Lovecraft)
 "The Little Glass Bottle" by H.P. Lovecraft
 "The Secret Cave" by H.P. Lovecraft
 "The Mystery of the Graveyard" by H.P. Lovecraft
 "The Mysterious Ship" by H.P. Lovecraft
 "The Alchemist" by H.P. Lovecraft
 "Poetry and the Gods" by H.P. Lovecraft
 "The Street" by H.P. Lovecraft
 "Old Bugs" by H. P. Lovecraft
 "Idealism and Materialism: A Reflection" by H. P. Lovecraft
 "The Commonplace Book of H. P. Lovecraft" annotated by August Derleth and Donald Wandrei
 "Lovecraft in Providence" by Donald Wandrei
 "Lovecraft as Mentor" by August Derleth
 "Out of the Ivory Tower" by Robert Bloch
 "Three Hours With H. P. Lovecraft" by Dorothy C. Walter
 "Memories of a Friendship" by Alfred Galpin
 "Homage to H. P. Lovecraft" by Felix Stefanile
 "H.P.L." by Clark Ashton Smith
 "Lines to H. P. Lovecraft" by Joseph Payne Brennan
 "Revenants" by August Derleth
 "The Barlow Tributes" by R.H. Barlow
 "H. P. Lovecraft: The Books" by Lin Carter
 "H. P. Lovecraft: The Gods" by Lin Carter
 "Addendum: Some Observations on the Carter Glossary" by T.G.L. Cockcroft
 "Notes on the Cthulhu Mythos" by George T. Wetzel
 "Lovecraft's First Book" by William L. Crawford
 "Dagon" by H. P. Lovecraft
 "The Strange High House in the Mist" by H. P. Lovecraft
 "The Outsider" by H. P. Lovecraft

Reception
Damon Knight reviewed the collection unfavorably, saying of the title story that "the protagonist's continued obtuseness drives the reader to chew paper" and faulting Lovecraft as a writer whose stories "are only endlessly retraced beginnings."

References

Sources

Short story collections by H. P. Lovecraft
Arkham House books
1959 books